Bradley Hay Neil (born 16 January 1996) is a Scottish professional golfer. He won the 2014 Amateur Championship.

Amateur career
In 2013, Neil won the Scottish Boys Championship. In 2014, he won The Amateur Championship, defeating Zander Lombard 2&1 in the final. This win qualified him for the Open Championship the next month and the following year's Masters Tournament and U.S. Open, in all of which he missed the cut.

Professional career
Neil made his professional debut the week after the U.S. Open, at the SSE Scottish Hydro Challenge on the Challenge Tour. In July 2017 he had his best finishes as a professional, joint runner-up in the Prague Golf Challenge and the Italian Challenge Open in successive weeks. He finished the season 15th in the Race to Oman rankings to earn his place on the 2018 European Tour.

Results in major championships

CUT = missed the half-way cut

Team appearances
Amateur
European Boys' Team Championship (representing Scotland): 2012
Jacques Léglise Trophy (representing Great Britain & Ireland): 2012, 2013 (winners)
European Amateur Team Championship (representing Scotland): 2013, 2014
St Andrews Trophy (representing Great Britain & Ireland): 2014 (winners)
Junior Ryder Cup (representing Europe): 2014
Eisenhower Trophy (representing Scotland): 2014

See also
2017 Challenge Tour graduates

References

External links

Scottish male golfers
European Tour golfers
People from Blairgowrie and Rattray
1996 births
Living people